Dudi Sela was the defending champion, but chose not to compete.

Go Soeda won the title, defeating Jimmy Wang in the final, 6–3, 7–6(7–5).

Seeds

  Lukáš Lacko (first round, retired)
  Go Soeda (champion)
  Gilles Müller (withdrew because of fatigue)
  Rajeev Ram (first round, retired)
  Samuel Groth (first round, retired because of a groin injury)
  Tatsuma Ito (first round, retired)
  Yūichi Sugita (withdrew because of an ankle injury)
  Jimmy Wang (final)
  John-Patrick Smith (first round)

Draw

Finals

Top half

Bottom half

References
 Main Draw
 Qualifying Draw

Busan Open Challenger Tourandnbsp;- Singles
2014 Singles